Mingay is a surname. Notable people with the surname include:

 Ben Mingay (born 1980), Australian actor and singer
 Gordon Mingay (1923–2006), British historian
 Harry Mingay (born 1895), English football goalkeeper
 Hugh Mingay (born 1974), musician
 Norm Mingay (1899–1955), Australian rugby union player
 Oswald Francis (Os) Mingay (1895-1973), Australian public servant, army signalman, radio manufacturer and prolific publisher of radio industry magazines